Jeff Stevenson (15 May 1932  – 13 October 2007)  was an English professional rugby league footballer who played in the 1950s and 1960s.

Background
Jeffrey Murray Stevenson was born in Meanwood, Leeds, West Riding of Yorkshire, England. The youngest of seven children born to Harold and Kate, he attended Buslingthorpe School on Meanwood Road and went on to join the RAF. From his first marriage he had two daughters Beverley and Tracey and was a  well liked Publican running the Anchor Inn Hunslet, The Fox and finally The Burtonstone in York. Jeff remarried and settled in his adopted City of York. He died from lung cancer in 2007 aged 75 in York, North Yorkshire, England.

Playing career

International honours
Jeff Stevenson represented Great Britain & France in the 37-31 victory over New Zealand at Carlaw Park, Auckland on 3 July 1957, won caps for Great Britain while at Leeds in 1955 against New Zealand (3 matches), in 1956 against Australia (3 matches), in 1957 against France (3 matches), in the 1957 Rugby League World Cup against France (1-try), Australia, New Zealand, in 1957 against France (2 matches), in 1958 against France, while at York in 1959 against Australia (2 matches), in 1960 against France (2 matches).

Jeff Stevenson also represented Great Britain while at Leeds between 1952 and 1956 against France (1 non-Test match).

Jeff Stevenson played  for Rugby League XIII while at Leeds in the 8-26 defeat by France on Saturday 22 November 1958 at Knowsley Road, St. Helens.

Challenge Cup Final appearances
Jeff Stevenson played , and was man of the match winning the Lance Todd Trophy in Leeds' 9–7 victory over Barrow in the 1957 Challenge Cup Final during the 1956–57 season at Wembley Stadium, London on 11 May 1957, in front of a crowd of 76,318.

County Cup Final appearances
Jeff Stevenson played  in Leeds' 24–20 victory over Wakefield Trinity in the 1958 Yorkshire County Cup Final during the 1958–59 season at Odsal Stadium, Bradford on Saturday 25 October 1958, and played  in Hunslet's 12–2 victory over Hull Kingston Rovers in the 1962 Yorkshire County Cup Final during the 1962–63 season at Headingley Rugby Stadium, Leeds on Saturday 27 October 1962.

References

External links
!Great Britain Statistics at englandrl.co.uk (statistics currently missing due to not having appeared for both Great Britain, and England)
Jeff Stevenson - Obituaries, News - The Independent
(archived by web.archive.org) Profile at leedsrugby.dnsupdate.co.uk
(archived by web.archive.org) Special Day For One Of Leeds' Greatest
(archived by web.archive.org) Jeff Stevenson RIP
(archived by archive.is) Jeff Stevenson Times Online Obituary (Paywall)

1932 births
2007 deaths
English rugby league players
Great Britain & France rugby league team players
Great Britain national rugby league team captains
Great Britain national rugby league team players
Hunslet F.C. (1883) players
Lance Todd Trophy winners
Leeds Rhinos players
Publicans
Rugby league halfbacks
Rugby league players from Leeds
Rugby League XIII players
York Wasps players